Thysanaspidini is a tribe of armored scale insects.

Genera
Thysanaspis

References

Aspidiotinae
Hemiptera tribes